Liosomaphis is a genus of true bugs belonging to the family Aphididae.

The species of this genus are found in Europe and Northern America.

Species:
 Liosomaphis atra Hille Ris Lambers, 1966 
 Liosomaphis berberidis (Kaltenbach, 1843)

References

Aphididae